Visual system homeobox 1 is a protein that in humans is encoded by the VSX1 gene.

The protein encoded by this gene contains a paired-like homeodomain and binds to the core of the locus control region of the red/green cone opsin gene cluster. The encoded protein may regulate expression of the cone opsin genes early in development. Mutations in this gene can cause posterior polymorphous corneal dystrophy (PPCD) and keratoconus. Two transcript variants encoding different isoforms have been found for this gene.

References

Further reading